ABERT is the Brazilian Association of Radio and Television Broadcasters (in Portuguese, Associação Brasileira das Emissoras de Rádio e Televisão). It was founded in November 1962. 
This Association advocate for press freedom and defends the rights and interests of Brazilian broadcasters.

See also
 SBTVD

External links
 ABERT

Television organisations in Brazil
Radio organisations in Brazil
1962 establishments in Brazil
Organizations established in 1962
Television organizations
Broadcasting associations